Environmental destruction, climate change, species extinction - these are topics that also move children. The generation, which will soon inherit the earth with all its problems, will speak in Saving My Tomorrow. In interviews and self-written songs children express their worries and desires and receive prominent support from stars like Tina Fey, Liam Neeson and Willie Nelson.

Episodes

References

External links

2014 American television series debuts
2017 American television series endings
2010s American documentary television series
2010s American television miniseries
HBO documentary films